The Big Bear International Film Festival was held in the mountain community of Big Bear Lake, California, from 2000–2014; every year, the festival expanded in its number of submissions and the prestige of their honorees, the festival hosted both film and screenplay competitions.

External links 
 Big Bear Lake International Film Festival

References 
Film festivals in California
Big Bear Lake, California